The Swadhyaya Movement or Swadhyaya Parivara started in mid 20th-century in the western states of India, particularly Maharashtra and Gujarat. Founded by Pandurang Shastri Athavale (1920-2003), the movement emphasizes self-study (swadhyaya), selfless devotion (bhakti) and application of Indian scriptures such as the Upanishads and Bhagavad gita for spiritual, social and economic liberation.

The movement focuses on the Upanishadic mahāvākyas (great teachings) related with Vedic belief that god is within oneself, every human being, all living beings and all of god's creation. It encourages voluntary self-study, self-knowledge, community discourses and action with a responsibility to the god in oneself and others. Its temples typically highlight the deities Yogeshwara Krishna, Parvati, Ganesha and Shiva in a Vriksha Mandir ("temple of trees") setting. Deity Surya is recognized in the form of sunlight. Prayers are performed in the Smarta tradition's Panchayatana puja format, attributed to Adi Shankara. Community members participate in Bhavabhakti (emotional devotion to the divine), Krutibhakti (actional devotion by voluntary service to the divine in all of god's creation), and Bhaktipheri (devotional travel to meet, work and help the well-being of the community partners). The movement members treat all men and women in the organization as a Parivara (family).

History 
Pandurang Shastri Athavale was born in a Maharashtrian Brahmin family in colonial India. In the 1940s, while he was in his early twenties, Athavale began to deliver discourses on the Bhagavad Gita in Mumbai, India. He argued that both the liberal welfare-centric approach and socialism were incapable of bridging the gap between rich and needy. He rejected charity handouts, arguing that this creates a dependent relationship, attacks human dignity, and robs the recipient's sense of self-worth. He sought another way for liberating oneself spiritually, economically, and socially. He believed that the foundation and values for such a search were in the ancient texts of Hinduism. He began preaching these principles from Upanishads and Bhagavad Gita in his community, particularly in the downtrodden segments of society he called Agri, Bagri, and Sagri. This initiative began Athavale's Swadhyaya movement in 1958. His followers call him "Dada" (elder brother).

The movement refuses any support or assistance from the state or non-governmental organizations (NGOs), relying entirely on volunteer activity of its members. It claims to have between 50,000 and 100,000 centres ("kendra" locations) and between 6 and 20 million followers in India, Portugal, USA, UK, Canada, Australia, New Zealand and the Middle East.

Discussion 

In standard Classical Sanskrit, svādhyāyaḥ (Devanāgarī: स्वाध्याय:) means study (adhyāya) by oneself (sva), i.e., private study or studying alone.  For Athavale and the Parivar, Swadhyay is interpreted as the study of the self for a spiritual quest, an innovative and striking interpretation.  According to members, it is a "journey to work out a unity in a multiverse of cultures and world views, of harmonizing the self with a network of relationships, of creating and maintaining vital connections between self, society, and God, of knowing and enriching human action with sacredness." The understanding of an in-dwelling God imbibed into Swadhyayees (practitioners of Swadhyay) by Athavale is claimed to motivate them towards true expression of devotion (Bhakti).

Athavale introduced educational institutions, developed wealth redistribution measures and social welfare projects. Athavale has shown that individual transformation eventually can lead to wider social change. Devotion, he says, can be turned into a social force. "Since God is with us and within us, he is a partner in all our transactions. Naturally, he has his share..." God's part of our wealth, Athavale suggests, can be redistributed among the poor and needy.

Athavale also presented the idea of Yogeshwar Krishi (divine farming) to the farming community. In this social experiment, a Swadhyayee gives a piece of land for use for a season as God's farm. Thereafter each person subsequently, one day a month, works on cultivating that particular plot of land. Seen as God's plot, the income thus generated is called "impersonal wealth" and belongs to no one but God. The wealth is consecrated in the local temple (called Amritalayam) and later disbursed to those in need as prasad or divinely blessed food. Swadhyay emphasizes "graceful giving" where "the help to the needy family's house is taken in the middle of the night so that others may not know that the family concerned has received help from the community."

Activities & "Prayogs"
Every activity in Swadhyay Parivar is based on Devotion, with a purpose to lift myself spiritually and to take me one step closer to God. Along with actively living Swadhyay principles in his daily life, Dada has been giving his discourses since 1942 to bring spirituality out in the common man. But instead of playing the role of teacher or preacher, he always became part of all and went to the same level of a common man, worked with all as a divine brother, and brought oneness in everyone who came into touch with him The understanding of indwelling God imbibed into his followers (known and referred as Swadhyayees) by Rev. Dada motivated them to willingly, knowingly and lovingly offer their efficiency, skill, and toil at the feet of God out of gratitude and reverence, which is a true expression of Devotion. The concept of Devotion has two important aspects: one self-exploration with a view to coming closer to God and two an active/creative principle of devotion to promote communal good. Through a series of Practical steps and programs, the awareness that the self is the abode of the Divine is facilitated.

Currently, Swadhyay is actively practiced in many countries (India, USA, UK, Middle East, Africa, Australia, New Zealand, Surinam, Fiji, West Indie, etc.) across the world with over 5 million active Swadhyayees practicing these principles in their daily life.

In addition, he started many social experiments (Prayogs) to bring man closer to man, and man closer to God. These prayogs were on the basis of Devotion (Bhakti), whereas Bhakti is not limited to only going to the temple, praying at your house, or donating money in the name of God.  It is more so on donating your time and efficiency to God. The by-product of these prayogs resulted in an alternative society where the other is not another, but he is my divine brother.

Prayogs (प्रयोग) (Social Experiments) by Swadhyaya Parivar

 Trikal Sandhya - Remembering God at the most important times in our life when God comes to gift us, three times a day: 1) morning (when we get up) recollection is gifted; 2) (when we have our food) digestion is gifted; and 3) (at night while sleeping) peace is gifted by God.
 Yuva/Yuvati Kendra  (Previously known as DBT - Divine Brain Trust) - Youth gatherings to discuss modern-day issues for ages 16 to 30.
 Bal Sanskar Kendra (BSK) - Sessions for kids between ages 7 to 15, learn verses from scriptures and stories from History, Puranas, and other texts.
 Swadhyaya Kendra - Meeting once a week to learn about Hindu Scriptures and listen to discourses given by Dada.
 Bhavpheri/Bhaktipheri - Selflessly and devotionally traveling to meet, work and help the well-being of community partners. Bhavpheri is usually more local, whereas Bhaktipheri may involve traveling further into rural areas or places where local Bhavpheri does not happen.
 Vruksha Mandir - Where villages have a collective garden or orchard and members, generally from Amrutalayam villages, come and help in the name of god. It incorporates seeing God residing in nature, usually through trees (Vruksha) in this method. 
 Madhav Vrund - A way for people who cannot access a Vruksha Mandir to respect and bond with nature; involves having plants in the house, keeping good care of them as a family, and reciting stotras like the Narayana Upanishad while watering the plant.
 Yogeshwar Krishi - Where farmers would meet once a month and farm in the name of God. If money is made in the process, it is considered God's and is used for village welfare or given to those who need it most at the time. Based on the Shrimad Bhagavad Gita: स्वकर्मणातमभ्यचर्य.
 ShriDarshanam- 9 Amritalayala's together make one ShriDarshanam.
 Matsyagandha - Where fishermen would meet once a month and fish in the name of God. Again, money made is God's and used for good works. Based on the Shrimad Bhagavad Gita: स्वकर्मणातमभ्यचर्य.
 Patanjali Chikitsalay - Where doctors would go to various parts of India and give their efficiency by treating their brothers and sisters.  Based on the Shrimad Bhagavad Gita: स्वकर्मणातमभ्यचर्य.
 Loknath Amrutalayam- ALl the people of that respective village people are Swadhyay members and respect and care for each other. In the evening, everyone gets together to do Kutumba Prarthana (prayer as a family) together in this Amrutalayam.
 Hira Mandir - The same idea as Matsyagandha and Yogeshwar Krushi, but with mineral miners and polishers.

Beliefs 
Swadhyay is a Sanskrit word. In the Parivar, Swadhyay means the study, knowledge, and discovery of the ‘Self’. The ‘Self’ or the ‘I’ is the indwelling spirit underlying the ego, the intellect, and the mind. Swadhyay involves studying, discovering, knowing, and understanding one's true and inner self and paying due respect to other selves. It is a "journey to work out a unity in a multiverse of cultures and world views, of harmonizing the self with a network of relationships, of creating and maintaining vital connections between self, society, and God, of knowing and enriching human action with sacredness." 

The teachers in the Swadhyay Parivar assert that it is not a sect, a cult, a creed, a tradition, an institution, or even an organization. It is not an organized religion. It does not require any membership or vows. It is not initiated to be an agitation or a revolution. Swadhyay is independent of caste, religion, nationality, color, education, and one's status in society. Swadhyay is about individual transformation through spiritual awareness.  It is an attitude of the mind. Swadhyay is the right perspective or the vision, which enables one to understand deeper aspects of spirituality and devotion. The basic fundamental thought that Swadhyay emphasizes is the concept of indwelling God. ‘God dwells within’ i.e. ‘God exists within me and within everyone else’. All are children of the Divine. Hence, Swadhyay establishes the Divine Brotherhood under the Fatherhood of God i.e. ‘the other is not ‘other’, but he is my divine brother.’ Blood relationship is extended to a relationship through the Blood Maker. The concept of the traditional family is extended to the Divine Family. This is a natural extension of the concept of an indwelling God. The concept looks very simple. However, for almost all of those who have come into deeper contact with Swadhyay, it has brought about a permanent transformation in their lives. The very understanding that God resides within me makes me divine and worthy of respect. It also inspires the view that God or divinity is everywhere, present in all living things, and therefore all should be treated with respect and devotion. Thus, the concept of an indwelling God motivates people to care for the welfare of others. 

Though Swadhyay does not function as a conventional organization but works as an extended family, it seems to have a definite vision. The vision is to achieve all-around upliftment of humanity at large through the holistic development of the human being by reason-based religion. Religion, in this context, refers to the Religion of a Human Being and should not be interpreted for conventional organized religions such as Hinduism, Islam, Christianity, Judaism, or Buddhism. Swadhyay is not interested in quick results or publicity, although it has been operating since the 1940s with incredible ‘results’, it has remained quite unknown to date. It neither seeks nor accepts financial help from governments or philanthropic agencies for any of its experiments, projects, or gatherings. It does not report to any donor, religious body, or controlling force; it has no political ideology or dogma. 

Swadhyay efforts resulted in creating a society that is self-disciplined, has faith in God, is adventurous and brave, loves culture and the Holy Scriptures, and is filled with devotion. In this society, greater importance will be given to the right attitude rather than to action, thoughts will be valued more than things, feelings more than enjoyment, self-surrender more than selfishness, group more than individual, culture more than manners, efforts more than results, goodness more than strength, truth more than mere logic and righteousness more than wealth. The origin of Swadhyay goes back to 1942, when Pandurang Shastri Athavale, the originator of the activity who is affectionately called (and hereafter referred to) as ‘Dada’ (Elder brother), started going on devotional visits alone in Mumbai, India. He inspired a small set of co-workers, primarily professionals, to go on similar visits themselves, to various villages around Bombay. Through the concept of an indwelling God, millions of individuals recognize the inner God, cultivate increased self-respect, and abandon immoral behavior. The villages where Swadhyay has a firm footing have witnessed a reduction in crime, the removal of social barriers, and a drastic alleviation from poverty, hunger, and homelessness, among other bad social and civic conditions.

Scriptures and foundation

Bhagavad Gita

Geeta 4.28 
dravya-yajñās tapo-yajñā yoga-yajñās tathāpare

swādhyāya-jñāna-yajñāśh cha yatayaḥ sanśhita-vratāḥ

Some offer their wealth as a sacrifice, while others offer severe austerities as a sacrifice. Some practice the eight-fold path of yogic practices, and yet others study the scriptures and cultivate knowledge as a sacrifice while observing strict vows.

Geeta 16.1 
abhayaṁ sattva-sanśhuddhir jñāna-yoga-vyavasthitiḥ

dānaṁ damaśh cha yajñaśh cha svādhyāyas tapa ārjavam

O son of Bharat, these are the saintly virtues of those endowed with a divine nature—fearlessness, purity of mind, steadfastness in spiritual knowledge, charity, control of the senses, performance of sacrifice, study of the sacred books, austerity, and straightforwardness;

Geeta 17.15 
anudvega-karam vakyam satyam priya-hitam ca yat

svadhyaya bhyasanam caiva van-mayam tapa ucyate

The austerity of speech consists in speaking words that are truthful, pleasing, beneficial, and not agitating to others, and also in regularly reciting Vedic literature.

Taittiriya Upanishad  

Hymn 1.9.1 emphasizes the central importance of Svadhyaya in one's pursuit of Reality (Ṛta), Truth (Satya), Self-restraint (Damah), Perseverance (Tapas), Tranquility and Inner Peace (Samas), Relationships with others, family, guests (Praja, Prajana, Manush, Atithi) and all Rituals (Agnaya, Agnihotram).

Taittiriya Upanishad, however, adds in verse 1.9.1, that along with the virtue of 'svādhyāyā' process of learning, one must teach and share (pravacana) what one learns. This is expressed by the phrase "'svādhyāyapravacane ca'", translated as "and learning and teaching" by Gambhīrānanda

In verse 1.11.1, the final chapter in the education of a student, the Taittiriya Upanishad reminds:

सत्यंवद। धर्मंचर। स्वाध्यायान्माप्रमदः।

Speak the Satya, follow the Dharma, from Svadhyaya never cease.

— Taittiriya Upanishad, 1.11.1-2

Patanjali's Yogasutra 

Verse II.44, recommends Svadhyaya as follows

स्वाध्यायादिष्टदेवतासंप्रयोगः॥

From study comes a connection with one's chosen deity. 

— Patanjali's Yogasutra II.44

References

Bibliography
 Swadhyaya: A Movement Experience in India - August 2003 Visions of Development: Faith-based Initiatives, by Wendy Tyndale. Ashgate Publishing, Ltd., 2006. . Page 1.
 Self-Development and Social Transformations?: The Vision and Practice of the Self-Study Mobilization of Swadhyaya, by Ananta Kumar Giri. Lexington Books. 2008. .
 Role of the swadhyaya parivar in socioeconomic changes among the tribals of Khedasan: A case study, by Vimal P Shah. Gujarat Institute of Development Research, 1998. .
 Vital Connections: Self, Society, God : Perspectives on Swadhyaya, by Raj Krishan Srivastava. 1998; Weatherhill, .
 "Dharma and Ecology of Hindu Communities: Sustenance and Sustainability", by Pankaj Jain. 2011; Ashgate, .

External links
 Swadhyay Parivar website

Bhakti movement
Organisations based in Mumbai
Hindu organisations based in India
Hindu new religious movements
Smarta tradition
Religious organizations established in 1954
1954 establishments in Bombay State